Captain Douglas John Bell  (16 September 1893 – 27 May 1918) was a South African World War I fighter ace credited with 20 aerial victories. He was one of the first fighter pilots to successfully engage an enemy multi-engine bomber. He became the leading ace of the nine in No. 3 Squadron RAF.

Early service
Bell was born in South Africa, the son of Herbert Bell and of Christine (née Williams) of Johannesburg, Transvaal. He first served in the Transvaal Light Horse Regiment during the South-West Africa Campaign of 1914–1915.

Bell enlisted in the Royal Flying Corps on 1 June 1916. He received his Aviator's Certificate on 22 September 1916. That same day, as a second lieutenant, he was appointed a flying officer. The following month, he was assigned to No. 27 Squadron, to fly the Martinsyde G.100. Despite the poor performance of a bomber so ungainly that it was nicknamed "The Elephant", Bell managed to score three victories flying the Martinsyde. He drove down an Albatros D.III on 1 May 1917; on 4 June, he shared the destruction of another D.III with another pilot, and drove a third down out of control. The performance made him one of the top two scorers with the Martinsyde. On 15 June, he was awarded the Military Cross for his performance of a long-distance bombing mission.

Bell was appointed a flight commander with the temporary rank of captain on 9 April 1917. He was then reassigned to No. 78 Squadron, which was flying Sopwith 1½ Strutters on Home Defence duty back in England. While with No. 78 he engaged a Gotha bomber on 25 September 1917. After nearly fifteen minutes of machine-gunning the Gotha, it crashed into the North Sea. His claim for this victory went unconfirmed; it would have been Home Defence's first victory.

Sopwith Camel ace
On 13 February 1918, Bell was transferred to No. 3 Squadron in France as a flight commander. He used Sopwith Camel no. C1615 to score ten triumphs in March. Most notable was 23 March, when he became a balloon buster by destroying an enemy observation balloon, then driving down out of control two defending Albatros D.Vs, all within five minutes.

In April, he had switched to Camel C6730 as C1615 had been lost in action on 24 March. He scored six times in April, including another balloon on the 8th, which he shared with another pilot.

He was awarded a Bar in lieu of a second award of the Military Cross on 13 May 1918.

Killed in action
On 27 May 1918, Bell drove down an enemy two-seater with two comrades for his twentieth win. He was killed by machine gun fire from observer Leut. Heinzelmann in a two-seater flown by Gefr. Rosenau. Bell's burial site is unknown. Ironically, he was killed near Thiepval, which would later become the site of a Memorial for the Missing who had died in the Battle of the Somme. As one of the many Allied airmen who died on the Western Front, but have no known grave, he is commemorated at the Arras Flying Services Memorial, Pas de Calais, France.

List of aerial victories
His wartime tally of 20 victories consisted of 1 (and 1 shared) balloons destroyed, 7 ( and 4 shared) aircraft destroyed, and 6 (and 1 shared) 'out of control'.

Honours and awards
Military Cross
2nd Lt. Douglas John Bell, R.F.C., Spec. Res.
"For conspicuous gallantry and devotion to duty when in command of a long distance bomb raid. Owing to his good leadership and skill a large ammunition dump was destroyed. Later, he single-handed carried out a difficult mission and succeeded in reaching his objective under extremely adverse weather conditions."

Bar to Military Cross
2nd Lt. (T./Capt.) Douglas John Bell, M.C., R.F.C., Spec. Res.
"For conspicuous gallantry and devotion to duty. He has led his formation with great skill and has destroyed three enemy aeroplanes and driven down two others, one of which was seen to be completely out of control. The high state of efficiency which his flight has attained is due to his splendid example and fearless leadership."

References
Notes

Bibliography

External links
 and also here

1893 births
1918 deaths
South African World War I flying aces
Royal Flying Corps officers
Recipients of the Military Cross
British military personnel killed in World War I
South African people of British descent
White South African people
South African military personnel